I Survived a Zombie Apocalypse is a 2015 reality TV game show made for BBC Three. It is described as "the toughest reality show on TV" and is presented by Greg James.

The show is centered on a group of contestants who must survive for seven days in an abandoned shopping centre overrun by zombies set six months after exposure to "5G Wifi". They have to make base, secure food, shelter and safety, and complete tasks set by the army. After seven days the army will evacuate any survivors out of the area to a "global tropical quarantine area".

The show was filmed at the Freeport Leisure and Retail Village in West Calder, Scotland. The zombies were all trained by ScareScotland a company that specialises in horror actors for film, theatre, events and television.

Contestants

Series summary 
According to the prequel comic by illustrator Nik Holmes, "5G Wi-fi" is released by tech mogul Declan Hugh who had exploited a legal loophole by pushing existing Wifi infrastructure without adequate testing, thus weakening the blood-brain barrier culminating in infection to the user. Over the coming days, a majority of the UK public begin developing a pink eye infection culminating in zombification. With the situation out of hand, the army has ordered all civilians to the Monroe Shopping Village and await extraction in seven days. The series is set six months after the outbreak, and originally follows a group of 10 contestants who have successfully reached the shopping centre, now abandoned and overrun by zombies. They quickly take refuge in a two-level clothing store, which has been quickly transformed into a makeshift barricaded shelter by the army, complete with a communications room for contact. During their stay, the army will periodically request the survivors to nominate certain people to leave the shelter and risk being killed by the zombies, so they can complete various tasks to retrieve and secure food and other supplies to improve the living conditions of the group. After seven days the army will evacuate any remaining survivors out of the area to a "global tropical quarantine area" until the incident passes and they can return to their normal lives.

Each episode chronicles events during the 7 day period with sporadic intervals from presenter Greg James, (who in the show's fictional premise, is one of the remaining presenters still alive in the country after the outbreak, and is surviving on his own, far away from the shopping center) commenting on the progress of the contestants and Public Service Announcement's from the "Preventative Agency for Neurological Transformations and Zombification" (P.A.N.T.Z.) advising how to stay alive during the outbreak, in black humor sketches for comic relief.

Episodes

Missions 
In each episode, the Army instructs the Survivors via a Communications Room (or through a radio whilst out of base) to complete Missions which could potentially lead to those chosen having to face the Zombies and risking death. The Survivors either decide as a group or are nominated by the Army to venture out of base. A crossed out name indicates that the Survivor died during the mission. A mission is deemed complete if the primary objective is accomplished.

 Tasha joined the mission as Aston and Megan were returning to base.
 Jordan completed the mission but was killed before returning to base.

Progress chart 

 The survivor won I Survived A Zombie Apocalypse.
 The survivor lasted the entire day and did not go on a mission.
 The survivor successfully completed a mission and returned to base.
 The survivor joined partway through the mission and returned to base.
 The survivor turned into a zombie during the mission.
 The survivor went on a mission and was killed by a zombie.
 The survivor died in an earlier episode and does not appear.

See also
Fight of the Living Dead: Experiment 88

References

External links

2015 British television series debuts
2015 British television series endings
BBC reality television shows
English-language television shows
Television series about viral outbreaks
Television series by Banijay
Zombies in television